Requienella is a genus of lichenized fungi in the family Requienellaceae.

The genus name of Requienella is in honour of Esprit Requien (1788–1851), who was a French naturalist, who made contributions in the fields of conchology, palaeontology and especially botany. 

The genus was circumscribed by Jean-Henri Casimir Fabre in Ann. Sci. Nat. Bot. ser.6, vol.15 on page 55 in 1883.

Species
As accepted by Species Fungorum;
 Requienella fraxini 
 Requienella lichenopsis 
 Requienella seminuda 

Former species; Requienella princeps  now Decaisnella princeps (in the Massariaceae family)

References

Pyrenulales
Lichen genera
Eurotiomycetes genera